The Spanish Ambassador to the Netherlands is the Ambassador of the Spanish government to the government of the Netherlands.

He is regularly coaccredited to the Organisation for the Prohibition of Chemical Weapons.

History
The Netherlands were part of the Spanish Monarchy until 1581, during the Dutch Revolt, when a number of provinces issued the Act of Abjuration repudiating Philip II of Spain. In 1609, on concluding the Twelve Years' Truce, Philip III of Spain agreed to deal with the Dutch Republic "as though" it were sovereign. Full mutual recognition and the accreditation of ordinary ambassadors came after the Peace of Münster, during the reign of Philip IV of Spain.

References

Netherlands
 
Spain